The Houston Street Ferry was a ferry route connecting Manhattan and Williamsburg, Brooklyn, New York City, United States, joining Houston Street (Manhattan) and Grand Street (Brooklyn) across the East River.

History
The Houston Street Ferry began operations in 1840, joining the Grand Street Ferry at Grand Street.

References

East River
Ferries of New York City